In mathematics, the Stoneham numbers are a certain class of real numbers, named after mathematician Richard G. Stoneham (1920–1996). For coprime numbers b, c > 1, the Stoneham number αb,c is defined as

It was shown by Stoneham in 1973 that αb,c is b-normal whenever c is an odd prime and b is a primitive root of c2. In 2002, Bailey & Crandall showed that coprimality of b, c > 1 is sufficient for b-normality of αb,c.

References 

.

Number theory
Sets of real numbers